Robert Francis LuPone (July 29, 1946 – August 27, 2022) was an American actor and artistic director. He worked on stage, in film, and in television. He was the brother of actress Patti LuPone.

Early life and training
LuPone was born in Brooklyn on July 29, 1946. His father, Orlando Joseph LuPone, worked as a school administrator and English teacher at Walt Whitman High School in Huntington, Long Island; his mother, Angela Louise (Patti), was a library administrator at the C.W. Post Campus of Long Island University. His great-great aunt was 19th-century Spanish-born Italian opera singer Adelina Patti. His father's side came from Abruzzo, while his mother's side is Sicilian. LuPone was raised in Northport, New York on Long Island. He trained as a dancer and was a graduate of Juilliard School, having studied with Antony Tudor, Jose Limon, and Martha Graham. He also studied theatre at HB Studio under Uta Hagen.

Career
After graduating from Juilliard in 1968, LuPone made his Broadway debut that same year as a dancer in "Noël Coward's Sweet Potato". He featured in three more shows in that same capacity before successfully auditioning for A Chorus Line (1976), having convinced Michael Bennett to let him play the role of the director, Zach. LuPone was nominated for the Tony Award for Best Featured Actor in a Musical, in what proved to be his final dancing role. His later performances included A Thousand Clowns (2001), True West (2000), A View from the Bridge (1997), Late Nite Comic (1987), Saint Joan (1977), and The Magic Show (1974). His numerous off-Broadway performances included Twelfth Night (1980), Black Angel (1982), and Lennon (1982). He also appeared in regional theater. He was the director of the MFA Drama Program at The New School for Drama (New York City) until the spring of 2011.

Together with his former student, Bernie Telsey, LuPone established the Manhattan Class Company in 1986. This eventually became the MCC Theater. As its artistic director, he produced Frozen (2004), Reasons To Be Pretty (2008), and "Hand to God" (2014), all of which were nominated for the Tony Award for Best Play and eventually made their way to Broadway.

On television, LuPone appeared in five episodes of The Sopranos as Dr. Bruce Cusamano, next-door neighbor of the titular Soprano family (1999–2007). He appeared on Law & Order: Criminal Intent for two episodes as Nelson Broome (2003–2009), and on Law & Order: Special Victims Unit for one episode in 2004. He also appeared on All My Children in the 1980s and Guiding Light in the 1990s. He appeared in the pilot episode of the NBC musical series Smash as well as the pilot episode of Showtime's drama Billions.

Personal life
At the time of his death, LuPone was a resident of Athens, New York. He was married to Virginia Robinson until his death. Together, they had one son. His younger sister is actress-singer Patti LuPone.

LuPone died on August 27, 2022, at a hospice facility in Albany, New York. He was 76, and suffered from pancreatic cancer prior to his death.

Filmography

Film

Television

References

External links

1946 births
2022 deaths
20th-century American male actors
21st-century American male actors
Alumni of the Drama Studio London
American male film actors
American male musical theatre actors
American male television actors
American people of Italian descent
American theatre managers and producers
Deaths from cancer in New York (state)
Deaths from pancreatic cancer
Juilliard School alumni
Male actors from New York City
People from Brooklyn
People from Greene County, New York
People from Northport, New York
The New School faculty